Sengkurong Library is a public library located in Sengkurong in Brunei-Muara District, Brunei.

References 

Dewan Bahasa dan Pustaka Library
Libraries in Brunei